In the Same Breath is a 2021 documentary film directed and produced by Nanfu Wang. It follows how the Chinese and American governments reacted to the outbreak of the COVID-19 pandemic.

It had its world premiere at the Sundance Film Festival on January 28, 2021. It was released in a limited release on August 12, 2021 by HBO Documentary Films prior to its broadcast on HBO on August 18, 2021.

Synopsis

The film follows the response of the Chinese and American governments to the COVID-19 pandemic.

Production
While Nanfu Wang was still working on another project, she set out to make a short film about the Chinese government's response to the COVID-19 pandemic, leaving her son with her mother. But as COVID-19 spread, Wang became worried and started looking for more information during her stay in China, she found that much of it was censored or false propaganda disseminated by the Chinese government. She began contacting cinematographers in Wuhan, China and soon realized that the stories about the pandemic were too important to be in a short film. She started incorporating the American response to the pandemic after seeing some U.S. health officials share misinformation about it. HBO Documentary Films came on board to produce and distribute the film.

Release
The film had its world premiere at the Sundance Film Festival on January 28, 2021. It also screened at South by Southwest in March 2021. It was released in a limited release on August 12, 2021, prior to its broadcast on HBO on August 18, 2021.

Reception

Critical reception 
On Rotten Tomatoes, the film has an approval rating of 96% based on reviews from 50 critics, with an average rating of 8.40/10. The critics' consensus reads: "Gripping and clear-eyed, In the Same Breath captures history as it's being written -- and governmental failures as they amplify worldwide tragedy."

Accolades

References

External links
 
 
 In the Same Breath Review: Nanfu Wang’s Disquieting Look at the Early Days of COVID in Wuhan, By Owen Gleiberman, Variety, January 28, 2021. Detailed plot summary.

2021 films
2021 documentary films
American documentary films
Films directed by Nanfu Wang
Documentary films about the COVID-19 pandemic
Documentary films about China
HBO documentary films
2020s American films